Ceratophyllus gilvus is a species of flea in the family Ceratophyllidae. It was described by Karl Jordan and Charles Rothschild in 1922.

References 

Ceratophyllidae
Insects described in 1922